Colm Kehoe (born 1973 in Bunclody, County Wexford) is an Irish hurler.  He played hurling with his local club HWH Bunclody and was a member of the Wexford senior inter-county team in the 1990s and 2000s. He received an All Ireland medal when he played corner back on the Wexford senior team who won the 1996 All Ireland Final against Limerick. 

Educated locally at Kilmyshall N.S.

References

1972 births
Living people
HWH Bunclody hurlers
Wexford inter-county hurlers
All-Ireland Senior Hurling Championship winners